The Kamensk-Shakhtinsky constituency (No.144) was a Russian legislative constituency in Rostov Oblast in 1993–2007. The constituency covered parts of Eastern Donbass and northern Rostov Oblast. During 2015 the constituency was absorbed by Belaya Kalitva constituency.

Members elected

Election results

1993

|-
! colspan=2 style="background-color:#E9E9E9;text-align:left;vertical-align:top;" |Candidate
! style="background-color:#E9E9E9;text-align:left;vertical-align:top;" |Party
! style="background-color:#E9E9E9;text-align:right;" |Votes
! style="background-color:#E9E9E9;text-align:right;" |%
|-
|style="background-color:"|
|align=left|Boris Danchenko
|align=left|Independent
|
|35.54%
|-
|style="background-color:"|
|align=left|Vadim Burkhovetsky
|align=left|Independent
| -
|17.07%
|-
| colspan="5" style="background-color:#E9E9E9;"|
|- style="font-weight:bold"
| colspan="3" style="text-align:left;" | Total
| 
| 100%
|-
| colspan="5" style="background-color:#E9E9E9;"|
|- style="font-weight:bold"
| colspan="4" |Source:
|
|}

1995

|-
! colspan=2 style="background-color:#E9E9E9;text-align:left;vertical-align:top;" |Candidate
! style="background-color:#E9E9E9;text-align:left;vertical-align:top;" |Party
! style="background-color:#E9E9E9;text-align:right;" |Votes
! style="background-color:#E9E9E9;text-align:right;" |%
|-
|style="background-color:"|
|align=left|Boris Danchenko (incumbent)
|align=left|Agrarian Party
|
|24.75%
|-
|style="background-color:"|
|align=left|Vitaly Yermolenko
|align=left|Independent
|
|17.85%
|-
|style="background-color:#2C299A"|
|align=left|Lyudmila Mazurok
|align=left|Congress of Russian Communities
|
|16.10%
|-
|style="background-color:"|
|align=left|Ivan Yevdokimov
|align=left|Independent
|
|8.75%
|-
|style="background-color:#FE4801"|
|align=left|Irina Pasechnikova
|align=left|Pamfilova–Gurov–Lysenko
|
|6.74%
|-
|style="background-color:#2998D5"|
|align=left|Vladimir Gavrilov
|align=left|Russian All-People's Movement
|
|6.39%
|-
|style="background-color:"|
|align=left|Aleksandr Kasyanov
|align=left|Liberal Democratic Party
|
|5.53%
|-
|style="background-color:"|
|align=left|German Petrov
|align=left|Independent
|
|3.62%
|-
|style="background-color:#000000"|
|colspan=2 |against all
|
|7.71%
|-
| colspan="5" style="background-color:#E9E9E9;"|
|- style="font-weight:bold"
| colspan="3" style="text-align:left;" | Total
| 
| 100%
|-
| colspan="5" style="background-color:#E9E9E9;"|
|- style="font-weight:bold"
| colspan="4" |Source:
|
|}

1999

|-
! colspan=2 style="background-color:#E9E9E9;text-align:left;vertical-align:top;" |Candidate
! style="background-color:#E9E9E9;text-align:left;vertical-align:top;" |Party
! style="background-color:#E9E9E9;text-align:right;" |Votes
! style="background-color:#E9E9E9;text-align:right;" |%
|-
|style="background-color:"|
|align=left|Boris Danchenko (incumbent)
|align=left|Communist Party
|
|25.03%
|-
|style="background-color:"|
|align=left|Yevgeny Stupak
|align=left|Independent
|
|17.13%
|-
|style="background-color:"|
|align=left|Igor Koryagin
|align=left|Independent
|
|15.29%
|-
|style="background-color:#1042A5"|
|align=left|Irina Pasechnikova
|align=left|Union of Right Forces
|
|9.47%
|-
|style="background-color:"|
|align=left|Yevgeny Fayustov
|align=left|Liberal Democratic Party
|
|8.06%
|-
|style="background-color:#FF4400"|
|align=left|Nikolay Astapov
|align=left|Andrey Nikolayev and Svyatoslav Fyodorov Bloc
|
|4.32%
|-
|style="background-color:"|
|align=left|Aleksandr Zelenkov
|align=left|Independent
|
|4.21%
|-
|style="background-color:"|
|align=left|Sergey Mrykhin
|align=left|Independent
|
|2.82%
|-
|style="background-color:#084284"|
|align=left|Vladimir Vasilevsky
|align=left|Spiritual Heritage
|
|2.17%
|-
|style="background-color:"|
|align=left|Valery Titarenko
|align=left|Independent
|
|1.61%
|-
|style="background-color:#000000"|
|colspan=2 |against all
|
|8.30%
|-
| colspan="5" style="background-color:#E9E9E9;"|
|- style="font-weight:bold"
| colspan="3" style="text-align:left;" | Total
| 
| 100%
|-
| colspan="5" style="background-color:#E9E9E9;"|
|- style="font-weight:bold"
| colspan="4" |Source:
|
|}

2003

|-
! colspan=2 style="background-color:#E9E9E9;text-align:left;vertical-align:top;" |Candidate
! style="background-color:#E9E9E9;text-align:left;vertical-align:top;" |Party
! style="background-color:#E9E9E9;text-align:right;" |Votes
! style="background-color:#E9E9E9;text-align:right;" |%
|-
|style="background-color:"|
|align=left|Vladimir Litvinov
|align=left|United Russia
|
|53.93%
|-
|style="background-color:"|
|align=left|Boris Danchenko (incumbent)
|align=left|Communist Party
|
|16.56%
|-
|style="background-color:"|
|align=left|Sergey Khoroshilov
|align=left|Independent
|
|12.18%
|-
|style="background-color:"|
|align=left|Sergey Shatsky
|align=left|Independent
|
|3.36%
|-
|style="background-color:#164C8C"|
|align=left|Aleksey Martynov
|align=left|United Russian Party Rus'
|
|2.00%
|-
|style="background-color:#000000"|
|colspan=2 |against all
|
|10.35%
|-
| colspan="5" style="background-color:#E9E9E9;"|
|- style="font-weight:bold"
| colspan="3" style="text-align:left;" | Total
| 
| 100%
|-
| colspan="5" style="background-color:#E9E9E9;"|
|- style="font-weight:bold"
| colspan="4" |Source:
|
|}

2005

|-
! colspan=2 style="background-color:#E9E9E9;text-align:left;vertical-align:top;" |Candidate
! style="background-color:#E9E9E9;text-align:left;vertical-align:top;" |Party
! style="background-color:#E9E9E9;text-align:right;" |Votes
! style="background-color:#E9E9E9;text-align:right;" |%
|-
|style="background-color:"|
|align=left|Vadim Varshavsky
|align=left|Independent
|
|46.79%
|-
|style="background-color:"|
|align=left|Oleg Mikheyev
|align=left|Independent
|
|26.86%
|-
|style="background-color:"|
|align=left|Viktor Kolomeytsev
|align=left|Independent
|
|12.89%
|-
|style="background-color:"|
|align=left|Artyom Mekhtibekov
|align=left|Independent
|
|1.92%
|-
|style="background-color:#000000"|
|colspan=2 |against all
|
|8.63%
|-
| colspan="5" style="background-color:#E9E9E9;"|
|- style="font-weight:bold"
| colspan="3" style="text-align:left;" | Total
| 
| 100%
|-
| colspan="5" style="background-color:#E9E9E9;"|
|- style="font-weight:bold"
| colspan="4" |Source:
|
|}

Notes

References

Obsolete Russian legislative constituencies
Politics of Rostov Oblast